Music from the Motion Picture Love & Basketball is the soundtrack to Gina Prince-Bythewood's 2000 film Love & Basketball. It was released on April 18, 2000 through Overbrook Music/Interscope Records, and mostly consisted of contemporary R&B with some hip hop music. The soundtrack was a minor success, peaking at number 45 on the Billboard 200, number 15 on the Top R&B/Hip-Hop Albums and number 1 on the Independent Albums.

Track listing

Notes
The tracks "Our Destiny" performed by Hinda Hicks, "This Woman's Work" by Maxwell, "Candy Girl" by New Edition, "Making Love In The Rain" by Herb Alpert with Lisa Keith and Janet Jackson, and "I Go To Work" by Kool Moe Dee, all of which feature prominently in the movie, do not appear on the soundtrack. "This Woman's Work" by Maxwell is a cover of the song of the same name by Kate Bush. The film also features the hit song Just Got Paid by Johnny Kemp, which plays during the prom scene.

Personnel

Abdul Zhuri — guitar arrangement
Ali Shaheed Muhammad — producer
Andy Phillips — product management
Angie Stone — arrangement, producer
Bernie Grundman — mastering
Bill Malina — engineering
Bob Bowen — music coordinator
Craig Bauer — engineering
Dana Sano — executive producer
Dave Pensado — mixing
Dylan Dresdow — assistant engineering
Jake & the Phatman — drum programming, producer
Jamal Peoples — keyboard arrangement
James Lassiter — executive producer
James Mtume — vocal producer
Jenny-Bea Englishman — backing vocals, string arrangement
John Dukakis — executive producer
Johnny Lee — art direction, design
Kenny Seymour — keyboard & string arrangement
Kim Hill — backing vocals
Lori Silfen — music business affairs
Mark Fraunfelder — assistant engineering
Mark Kaufman — music clearance
Melodee Sutton — music supervisor
Michelle Lynn Forbes — assistant engineering
Mitch Rotter — executive producer
Neil Pogue — mixing
Pilar McCurry — executive producer
Raphael Saadiq — bass, string arrangement, producer
Reginald Dozier — engineering
Rob Chiarelli — mixing
Sidney Baldwin — photography
Spike Lee — producer
Steve "Silk" Hurley — arrangement, engineering, mixing, programming, producer
Steve Johnson — engineering
The South Central Chamber Orchestra — orchestra
Toby Emmerich — executive producer
Tony Peluso — engineering
Tony Prendatt — engineering
William Adams — arrangement, engineering, producer
Winterton Garvey — concertmaster

Charts

References

External links

2000 soundtrack albums
2000s film soundtrack albums
Albums produced by will.i.am
Albums produced by Raphael Saadiq